Serenade is the fourth album by Welsh mezzo-soprano Katherine Jenkins, released on 6 November 2006, in the UK. It charted at number 5 on the UK Albums Chart and at number 1 on the UK Classical Album Chart.

Track listing 
 ""(Quello che faró) Sarà per te"
 "Nella Fantasia"
 "Chanson Bohème" (from Bizet's Carmen)
 "Green Green Grass of Home"
 "O Mio Babbino Caro"
 "Be My Love"
 "The Flower Duet" (feat. Kiri Te Kanawa)
 "Pachelbel's Canon"
 "Granada"
 "Lisa Lân"
 "The Prayer"
 "Dear Lord and Father of Mankind"
 "Il Canto"
 "Ave Maria"

Charts

Weekly charts

Year-end charts

Certifications

References 

Katherine Jenkins albums
2006 albums
Universal Classics and Jazz albums